Lychas buchari, also known as the yellow sand scorpion, is a species of small scorpion in the Buthidae family. It is native to Australia, and was first described in 1997 by Czech arachnologist Frantisek Kovarik.

Etymology
The species epithet buchari honours Czech arachnologist Jan Buchar of Charles University in Prague.

Description
The base colour of the species is a uniform yellow to yellowish-brown. The length of the male holotype is 42.4 mm.

Distribution and habitat
The species is found in central Australia, including northern South Australia, western New South Wales and Western Australia. The scorpions have been seen to roam at night across sand-dunes surrounding dry salt lakes.

References

 

 
buchari
Scorpions of Australia
Endemic fauna of Australia
Fauna of New South Wales
Fauna of South Australia
Fauna of Western Australia
Animals described in 1997